Brian McCotter (born 1984 in Belfast, Northern Ireland) is an Irish professional basketball player and currently plays for Newcastle University Knights.

Brian is a product of St. Malachy's College basketball team and was named MVP in the All Ireland U19 Schools Final after hitting 29 points. Brian was also named Irish Senior Schoolboy player of the year in 2002 and has represented Ireland at Junior Men's level. Brian started his club career with Star of the Sea Basketball Club in Belfast.

The  guard Glasgow Caledonian University where he captained the Scotland Universities side, while also playing for Scottish Basketball League side Troon Tornadoes from 2004 to 2006 winning the Scottish National League title and two Scottish National Cups and being named to the West All Star Team in 2005. Brian also holds the Scottish University scoring record after hitting 57 points against Edinburgh University in 2005.

Brian is said to be a good ball handler with a nice turn of speed around the court. An excellent shooter he also has great work ethic, which impressed Newcastle Eagles coach Fabulous Flournoy enough to sign him during the summer of 2006. While at the Eagles Brian won the BBL Championship twice, BBL League twice and BBL Trophy once.

References

1984 births
Living people
Alumni of Glasgow Caledonian University
Newcastle Eagles players
Men's basketball players from Northern Ireland
Sportspeople from Belfast
Guards (basketball)